Robert Balfour may refer to:

Robert Balfour (philosopher) ( 1553–1621), Scottish philosopher
Robert Balfour, 2nd Lord Balfour of Burleigh (died 1663), Scottish military commander
Robert Balfour, 5th Lord Balfour of Burleigh (died 1757), Scottish Jacobite
Robert Balfour, 4th of Balbirnie (1698–1766), Scottish Member of Parliament
Robert Balfour, 6th of Balbirnie (1772–1837), British Army general
Sir Robert Balfour, 1st Baronet (1844–1929), British politician, MP for Glasgow Partick
Robert Balfour, 3rd Earl of Balfour (1902–1968), Scottish peer
Robert Drummond Balfour (1844–1915), cricketer